Amanda Tapping (born 28 August 1965) is a British-Canadian actress and director. She is best known for portraying Samantha Carter in the Canadian–American military science fiction television series Stargate SG-1, Stargate Atlantis, and Stargate Universe. She also starred as Helen Magnus in the science fiction-fantasy television series Sanctuary.

Early life 
Born in Rochford, Essex, England, Tapping moved with her family to Ontario, Canada, when she was three years old. She attended North Toronto Collegiate Institute, where she excelled in environmental science and drama. However, when she finished in 1984, she decided to focus her attention on drama, attending the University of Windsor School of Dramatic Arts in Windsor, Ontario.

Career 

After graduation, Tapping continued to study theatrical arts while performing in several stage productions. She appeared in several television commercials and played a variety of roles in television and film productions, such as The Outer Limits and The X-Files. She also formed a comedy troupe, the "Random Acts", with collaborators Katherine Jackson and Anne Marie Kerr, in Toronto in the early 1990s.

Tapping is best known for her portrayal of Samantha Carter in the science fiction television series Stargate SG-1, which debuted in 1997. After SG-1 aired its final episode, Tapping reprised the role of Samantha Carter on Stargate Atlantis as the new commander of the Atlantis expedition. In season 5, however, Tapping's role on the show was reduced to that of "special guest-star" with only occasional appearances because she chose to focus her attention on the development of a new series for Syfy called Sanctuary. The show expanded on an original series of eight webisodes released on the internet in 2007. The bulk of the scenery and characters were entirely green screen and CGI creations. Tapping served as both star and executive producer of the show.

In 2007, she won a Canadian Comedy Award for Best Actress for her role in the short film Breakdown.

On 18 September 2012, she was cast as an angel named Naomi on season 8 of the TV series Supernatural. She was a recurring character who appeared in seven episodes. She reprised the role in season 13's "Funeralia", nearly five years after the character's apparent death.

She was also named as ACTRA's 2015 Woman of the Year.

Directing 
Tapping's directing debut was during the seventh season of Stargate SG-1 on an episode titled "Resurrection", written by co-star Michael Shanks. She also directed the Sanctuary season two episode "Veritas". She has directed three episodes of Primeval: New World, three episodes (2.12; 3.06; 3.07) of Continuum, and four episodes of Olympus and more recently episodes of Dark Matter, Van Helsing, The Magicians, and Supernatural, as well as the historical drama X Company  She also directed five episodes of the Netflix series Travelers and the season finale of the 2017 series Anne with an E.

Personal life 
Tapping is married to Alan Kovacs and they live together in Vancouver, British Columbia. Tapping has one daughter, with Kovacs. Tapping has openly shared the difficult experiences she has undergone through eight miscarriages during her marriage in hope that her story would help other miscarrying women feel less isolated.

Tapping has two living brothers, Richard and Christopher. A third brother, Steven, who suffered from epilepsy and often uncontrollable seizures, died in December 2006 of causes unreleased by the Tapping family.

Filmography

Film

Television

Director

Theatre 
The Wizard of Oz
The Lion in Winter as "Alais Capet"
Steel Magnolias – West End Theater
Look Back in Anger as "Alison" (1986)
Children of a Lesser God as "Sarah" (1987)
The Taming of the Shrew as "Bianca" (1988)
Noises Off
The Shadow Walkers

Awards and nominations 
Tapping has won 6 awards, out of 13 nominations.

References

External links 

 
 
 
 
 

1965 births
20th-century Canadian actresses
21st-century Canadian actresses
20th-century British actresses
21st-century British actresses
Actresses from Essex
Actresses from Toronto
Canadian stage actresses
Canadian film actresses
Canadian television actresses
Canadian television directors
English film actresses
English stage actresses
English television actresses
English television directors
English emigrants to Canada
Canadian women television directors
Living people
People from Rochford
University of Windsor alumni
Canadian twins
English twins
20th-century English women
20th-century English people
21st-century English women
21st-century English people
Canadian Comedy Award winners